Wallace M. Crutchfield was a college football player and reverend.

Vanderbilt University
Crutchfield was a prominent guard for the Vanderbilt Commodores football team of Vanderbilt University from 1896 to 1901, at that time "the biggest man that ever played on the Vanderbilt football team," weighing 230 pounds. He was selected All-Southern by W. A. Lambeth in 1899.

References

American football guards
Vanderbilt Commodores football players
All-Southern college football players
19th-century players of American football